Mocis bahamica  is a moth of the family Erebidae. It is found on the Bahamas.

References

Moths described in 1913
Endemic fauna of the Bahamas
bahamica